Martin Hawke may refer to:
 Martin Hawke, 7th Baron Hawke, English cricketer
 Martin Hawke, 2nd Baron Hawke, British peer and politician